Kew High School is a co-educational school in suburban Melbourne for students in years 7–12.

The school has an enrolment of approximately 1146 students from the suburbs of Kew, Balwyn, Hawthorn, Ivanhoe, and Richmond.

School grounds and facilities
The school is situated on a single campus adjoining parkland in the suburb of East Kew, approximately 8 kilometres from Melbourne CBD.
Facilities of the school include
 The Renaissance Centre, a performing arts centre which is used for the bi-annual school production and music and drama classes.
 A large gymnasium
 A Senior School (VCE) Centre for the use of Year 11 and 12 students
 An indoor canteen and adjoining paved outdoor dining area
 A library
 Three outdoor basketball courts and two soccer pitches with artificial surfaces
 Specialised facilities for STEM, music, food technology, visual arts, drama and languages

Music
The school's theatre "The Renaissance Centre" is regularly used by other schools and community organisations for performances with a capacity of 470 people.

A recording of a choir from the school singing "Come Together" by The Beatles was sampled for the Avalanches' 2016 album Wildflower.

House system

The houses compete in a variety of sporting events throughout the school year, including:
 Swimming Carnival
 Athletics Carnival

Notable alumni

Robert DiPierdomenico — Former Australian rules footballer with Hawthorn
Pez — Australian hip hop recording artist from Melbourne, Australia
Dom Dolla — Australian house music producer
Adam Gotsis — Australian professional American footballer
Jessica Dal Pos — AFLW Footballer
Evan Evagora — The first Australian to be a regular cast member in a Star Trek TV series

References

Public high schools in Melbourne
1963 establishments in Australia
Educational institutions established in 1963
Buildings and structures in the City of Boroondara